This is an incomplete list of koryū (lit. "traditional schools", or "old schools").  Koryū are schools of martial arts that originated in Japan, and were founded prior to 1876, when the act prohibiting the wearing of swords (Haitōrei) came into effect after the Meiji Restoration.

Alphabetical listing

Comprehensive systems
 Asayama Ichiden-ryū
 Kashima Shin-ryū
Kukishin-ryū
 Sekiguchi Shinshin-ryū
 Suiō-ryū
 Tatsumi-ryū
 Tenshin Shōden Katori Shintō-ryū
 Tenshinsho Jigen Ryu
 Takenouchi-ryū
 Tendō-ryū
 Yagyū Shingan-ryū

Grappling/close-quarters ryu (armoured, unarmoured)
Daitō-ryū Aiki-jūjutsu
Hontai Yōshin-ryū
Kitō-ryū
Kukishin-ryū
Sekiguchi-ryū
Shindo Yoshin-ryū
Sosuishi-ryū
Tenjin Shin'yō-ryū
Yagyū Shingan-ryū
Yōshin-ryū - Founded by Akiyama Yoshitoki
Yōshin-ryū (Yōshin Koryū) - Founded by Miura Yōshin

Sword-drawing ryu (Batto, iai, etc.)
Hoki-ryū
Musō Shinden-ryū
Musō Jikiden Eishin-ryū
Sekiguchi-ryu
Tamiya-ryū (Kuroda)
Tamiya-ryū (Tsumaki)

Sword-fighting ryu (kenjutsu, tojutsu)
Hyōhō Niten Ichi-ryū
Ittō-ryū
Hokushin Ittō-ryū
Itto Shoden Muto-ryū
Kogen Ittō-ryū
Mizoguchi-ha Ittō-ryū
Nakanishi Ittō-ryū
Ono-ha Ittō-ryū
Jigen-ryū
Kage-ryū
Kage-ryū (Aizu)
Kashima Shinden Jikishinkage-ryū
Kashima Shintō-ryū
Maniwa Nen-ryū
Mugai-ryū
Nen-ryū
Tennen Rishin-ryū
Tenshin Shōden Katori Shintō-ryū
Tenshin-ryū Hyou-hō
Shingyotō-ryū
Shinkage-ryū
Yagyū Shinkage-ryū

Spear/polearm-fighting ryu (sojutsu, naginatajutsu)
Higo Ko-ryū
Hōzōin-ryū
Toda ha Buko-ryū
Yoshin-ryu (not to be confused with Hontai Yōshin-ryū)

Stick/Staff ryu (jo, bo)
Shintō Musō-ryū

Various weaponry
 Isshin-ryū (not to be confused with Isshin-ryū karate)

References

Japanese martial arts
Ko-ryū bujutsu